Simalungun Regency is a regency in North Sumatra, Indonesia. Its seat was formerly at Pematangsiantar, but this city was in recent years separated from the Regency and made into an independent city (kota), although it remains geographically surrounded by the regency, whose new administrative seat is at Raya. The regency now covers an area of 4,372.5 square kilometres, and at the 2010 census it had a population of 817,720; at the 2020 Census this had risen to 990,246, of whom 497,314 were male and 492,932 were female.

Demography 

The principal group of inhabitants of the Regency (and of Pematangsiantar city, an enclave within the regency) are the Simalungun people, a sub-group of the Batak people. Their language (Simalungun language) is an Austronesian language.

Regent 
The regent of Simalungun is Radiapoh Hasiholan Sinaga, SH, who was elected as Regent of Simalungun on Pilkada (election of regional head) 2020.

Administrative districts 
The regency in 2010 was divided administratively into thirty-one districts (kecamatan), but in 2017 a 32nd district - Dolog Masagal - was created. These are tabulated below with their areas and their populations at the 2010 Census  and 2020 Census. The table also includes the locations of the district administrative centres, the number of administrative villages (rural desa and urban kelurahan) in each district, and its post code.

Note: (a) The 2010 population of the new Dolog Masagal District is included in the figure for Raya District, from which it was cut out in 2017.

Culture
Dayang Bandir and Sandean Raja is a folk story from Simalungun.

Tourism

White Crater
Local people mention it as Bukit Kapur Tinggi Raja, but some people also called it as Kawah Putih (White Crater) same name as Kawah Putih in West Java. The crater is located in Dolok Tinggi Raja Village, 90 kilometers from Medan or 3 to 4 hours drive by motorcycles with route Medan-Lubuk Pakam-Galang-Bangun Purba-Dolok Tinggi Raja.

Parapat

Parapat is a small town located on the shore of Lake Toba. This place is known for tourism, and ferry services to Samosir Island are also available.

References 

Regencies of North Sumatra